Nagle Catholic College commonly known as Nagle or NCC, is an independent Roman Catholic co-educational secondary day school, located in the coastal town of Geraldton in the Mid West region of Western Australia, Australia. The college was founded in 1994, as a result of a merger of Stella Maris Presentation College, established in 1891 and St. Patrick's College founded in 1926.

Overview 
Nagle Catholic College is named after the Presentation Sisters founder, The Venerable Nano Nagle. Formerly a boarding college, Nagle is now a day school catering for students from Year 7 to Year 12. The current college's campus is located on the Stella Maris Presentation College site, which today has grown to a college catering to 1,200 students.

Prior to the establishment of Nagle, St Patrick's College and Stella Maris Presentation College was the only form of Catholic higher school education available in Geraldton. Stella Maris College was founded by the Presentation Sisters while St Patrick's College was established by the Christian Brothers. Stella Maris provided higher education for females, while its counterpart provided higher education for the male demographic of Geraldton.

The college formerly housed a convent for the Presentation Sisters, which became a primary school and a church prior the establishment of St Francis Xavier's Cathedral. Moreover, the campus was built on former sandhills hence its hilly landscape.

In 2016, Nagle commenced the formation of a campus in Carnarvon, where it offers an opportunity for Carnavon students to achieve a catholic high school education, without leaving their hometown.

Nagle Catholic College was voted "Best School" in Geraldton as voted in The Best of Geraldton competition, held by Red FM.

History
Nagle Catholic College was formed from the agreement between authorities of the two parent colleges, Stella Maris Presentation College and St Patrick's College. The authorities thought it would be beneficial to combine the schools, to better cater for the students. The college was named after Nano Nagle, who founded the Presentation Sisters in Ireland in 1775.

Arrival of Presentation Sisters (1891-1902) 
The origins of Nagle Catholic College is woven into history that spans back to 1891 when Bishop Gibney, requested the Presentation Sisters from Ireland begin teaching in Geraldton. The sisters founded the 'Star of the Sea' Young Lady's Secondary Education Academy erected on the corner of Marine Terrace and Lewis Street.

In 1896, the government withdrew all funding, hence making the college completely independent.

In 1901, the college opened its doors to boarders, as boarding facilities became available.

Stella Maris Presentation College (1903-1993) 
In 1903, the Presentation Convent was erected at its present site in Sanford Street, where it acted as a primary school and a church prior the establishment of St Francis Xavier Cathedral.

In 1911, the construction of the new college campus began beside the current convent, where the first stone was laid by Bishop Bernard Kelly, the first bishop of Geraldton. The construction finished in 1912 and was welcomed by many commendations on its presentation. In 1913, the campus was officially named Stella Maris Presentation College. Mother Joseph O'Connell, the foundress of the Presentation community died in 1933,

50 years of the Presentation Sisters in Geraldton was marked in 1941, and was celebrated by guests arriving from throughout the state. The outbreak of World War II affected the college in 1942, where students were evacuated to Mount Magnet.

The 'Prefect concept' was introduced in 1943 to give senior students a sense of leadership. Melva Sallans carried out the duties of Senior Perfect, assisted by Effie Dallimore, Joan Mulligan and Rica Diamond.

The Diamond Jubilee of the Presentation Sisters in 1951 is celebrated with a new wing to the school.

In 1961, severe flooding of the town caused for an evacuation of the students to Carnarvon.

The campus was enlarged during the 1970s and 1980s with the second extension of the campus, a new sports oval, the completion of the Maitland Street Extension, new auditorium, new pool and new tennis courts all being constructed on these two decades.

In 1977, the Stella Maris Orchestra and Choir performed for Queen Elizabeth II and the Duke of Edinburgh.

The house system was introduced in 1978 with the houses: Finns, Russels, Nagles and O'Connels being established.

During 1985, the college bought nine Commodore 64 computers to encourage digital learning.

In 1991, the centenary of the Presentation Sisters in Western Australia and the centenary of Stella Maris college was celebrated.

Stella Maris College celebrated its final year in 1993, before it amalgamates with St. Patrick's College to form Nagle Catholic College.

St. Patrick's College (1925-1993) 

On 22 June 1925, Bishop Richard Ryan wrote a plea to the Australian Provincial of the Christian Brothers for an opening of a new educational institution for males in Geraldton:

Hence on 11 December, Brother Celsus O'Donnell arrived in Geraldton to prepare the opening of the new boarding college. On the school year of 1926, St Patrick's College was officially opened with Brother O'Donnell as the first principal. On the 15th of February, there was a reported sixty day boys and ten boarders in attendance.

In 1940, the first prefects were appointed with Kevin Bradley, Geoffrey Meyer, John White, Bernard Williams, Charles Cripps and Ronald Hesford undertaking the positions.

St Patrick's Day in 1943 was marked with sports and surfing, which was the origin of the popular St Patrick's Day tradition Nagle participates every year.

During the 60s, bands began to form with 'Les Silhouettes' and 'The Doppler Effect' taking over the St Patrick's College music scene.

In 1976, the Golden jubilee of St Patrick's College was built, with a new primary school being built.

During 1994, St Patrick's College began the process of merging with Stella Maris College to form Nagle Catholic College.

Currently, the St Patrick's College campus is home to the Catholic Education Geraldton branch and Leaning Tree Primary School.

Nagle today (1994–present) 
In 1994, Nagle Catholic College was founded, combining the two boarding colleges. Therefore, it was the first time the two genders combined in one school. The authority chose the Stella Maris Presentation College campus to grow the newly combined college. Bishop Justin Bianchini formally commissioned the college.

Nagle has grown into a dynamic college with new buildings erecting in the campus. For example, are the Edmund Rice Library, Bishop Bianchinni Gymnasium and Maslen Science Area, with all three buildings erected around within the decade.

In 2016, Nagle expanded its operations to the remote town of Carnavon, where it offers Years 11-12 a similar curriculum as the original curriculum of the Geraldton campus.

Headmasters and Principals

Stella Maris College

St. Patrick's College

Nagle Catholic College 
The following individuals have served as College Principal of Nagle Catholic College:

Campus 
The Nagle Catholic College campus is built along Sanford St and Maitland St in Geraldton. On Nagle's eastern side is the St Francis Xavier Cathedral, Geraldton. The college is also in close proximity to the coast, thus creating Nagle as the most western catholic school in Australia.

The campus is split into eight learning areas:
 Stella Maris Learning Area- The original campus building, and central learning area. It is located in the heart of the campus, thus holding main offices and the oldest classrooms. Notably, it holds the drama room and the Japanese rooms.
 St Patrick Learning Area- This extension holds the majority of Nagle's classrooms, which range from Sciences in the second floor to Mathematics in the third floor. It also holds the Year 12 Study and Recreation Room and the Study Hall. 
 Vin Duffy Learning Area- Home to the technologies classrooms including two woodwork rooms, a metalwork room and a design technical graphics room. It holds the Staff Room at the second floor.
 Edmund Rice Learning Area- A state of the art library featuring a conference room, a computer lab, two learning areas plus a quiet outdoor learning area.
 Lecaille Learning Area- Home of the Arts department including the art rooms and music rooms. It is located at the most western part of the school.
 Maslen Science Learning Area- Home to three big classrooms, home to the Science department. It also holds majority of the Science equipment.
 Bishop Justin Bianchini Gymnasium- This the newest addition to the Nagle Campus. The new gymnasium is home to basketball courts, netball courts, volleyball courts, rock climbing walls, weights room, dance studio and change rooms. The main court features a retractable seating platform, used during assemblies. With additional seating, the court could hold over 1000 students. It is also home to 8 new classrooms.
 Paschal Centre- a former Presentation Sisters convent home to staff offices and student matters.
In addition, the campus holds a massive sports oval, a swimming pool, two outdoor courtyards and four tennis/basketball courts in the front of the school.

Academics
The school fosters students in Years 7 through to 12, with each Year or set of Years having different focuses on courses.

In 2012, 100% of Nagle Catholic College's students achieved a WACE. And during the same year, Nagle was on top for the Best Performing in WA for Geography.

For 2015, Nagle was the best performing school in Geraldton, as it was the only school that made to the top 50 schools in WA for Vocational Education and Training (VET). 96% of Nagle Catholic College VET students achieved a Cert II or higher and was ranked 40th in WA. Meanwhile, ATAR students had a median of 70 as an ATAR score, with 5.87% achieving an ATAR above 75. Out of 417 Geraldton students applicable for a WACE Certificate, 154 are from Nagle Catholic College. 99.35% of students are reported to have graduated in 2015.

Arts 
The Arts is one of the respected areas of the college, where the college has contributed to the culture of the town. The college includes a Jazz band, a Rock band and a choir.

Rags To Riches is Nagle's annual themed fundraiser and arts showcase, boasting a fashion show, drama productions, dances and bands.

Physical Education 
Physical Education is one of the valued Learning Areas of the college. The college holds an interhouse Athletics Carnival, Swimming Carnival and Cross Country. The department also holds a St Patrick's Day Games promoting healthy, competitive and active games. The college also annually holds trips including Gold Coast Netball and the Ski Trip.

Houses 
Nagle Catholic College established six houses on its foundation and added two new houses in 2014. Dedicated to the former Bishops of Geraldton, these houses include:

Notable alumni
A number of notable people have graduated or attended Nagle Catholic College, Stella Maris College or St Patrick's College.

 Fergus Kavanagh, Olympic medallist, earning it with the Australian Hockey team. He was 2002's Nagle Head Boy
 Josh Kennedy, Australian Football League player for the West Coast Eagles
 Mandy McElhinney, Australian actress known to play Rhonda in AAMI insurance ads. She attended Stella Maris College as a boarder
 Jaeger O'Meara, Australian Football League player for the Hawthorn Football Club
 Tasma Walton, Australian actress  known for the TV shows Blue Heelers and Home and Away. She attended Stella Maris College

See also

 Catholic education in Australia

References

External links 
 http://ncc.wa.edu.au/

Geraldton
Educational institutions established in 1994
1994 establishments in Australia
Presentation Sisters schools
Catholic secondary schools in Western Australia
Former Congregation of Christian Brothers schools in Australia